Nima Taghavi (born July 15, 1970, Iran) is an Iranian-American entrepreneur known for creating Crave Entertainment, an American video game developer who published games for Dreamcast, Wii, Nintendo DS, Game Boy Advance, Nintendo 64, Nintendo GameCube, PlayStation, PlayStation 2, PlayStation 3, PSP, Xbox, and Xbox 360 publications. In 2005. He was also given national recognition for his work with the Clinton Foundation.

Career
In 1993, Taghavi founded SVG Distribution Inc, a video game wholesale distribution company located in Los Angeles, California.

In 1997, Taghavi founded Crave Entertainment, a video game publisher (and sister company to SVG).

In 1999, Taghavi founded Crave Entertainment Group to become the umbrella company for the SVG and Crave companies. In 2005 SVG and Crave where sold, under the umbrella of Crave Entertainment Group, to The Handleman Company (NYESE: HDL). Taghavi left the following year in 2006. At the time of sale, Crave Entertainment Group was the largest privately held company in the video game industry with revenue of approximately $300 million

In 2009 Taghavi founded Solutions 2 GO LLC (U.S.), a video game distribution company as a value-added sales, marketing, and logistics company of video game entertainment products for the Sony PSP system, Sony PlayStation3 system, Sony PlayStation4 system, Sony PlayStation5 system, Nintendo Wii, Nintendo Wii U, Nintendo Switch, Nintendo DS, Microsoft Xbox, Microsoft Xbox One, Microsoft Xbox One X video game entertainment system. Solutions 2 GO (Canada) was the 2009 recipient of the Ontario Ernst & Young Entrepreneur of The Year Award for the category of business-to-business products and services. Solutions 2 GO made Deloitte Canada’s Top 50 Best Managed Companies for the consecutive years between 2009-201.7 In 2014 Solutions 2 GO became the exclusive distributor for Sony’s PlayStation brand in Latin America and in 2015 its exclusive distributor in Mexico. After reaching well over $1B USD in revenue between the Solutions 2 GO companies in 2016, Taghavi sold his interest in the combined companies to his Canadian partners in 2017.

In 2013 Taghavi co-founded the real estate investment management firm BKM Capital Partners. BKM Capital Partners is a firm specializing in the acquisition and improvement of multi-tenant business parks. Taghavi was joined by John Mack, the former CEO & Chairman of the Board at Morgan Stanley as an investor, business partner, and board advisor. BKM Capital Partners raised its first institutional fund in 2016 with $105 million in capital commitments, focused on industrial properties across the western United States. In 2017, The Canyon Catalyst Fund, a discretionary separate account managed by Canyon Partners Real Estate on behalf of the California Public Employees’ Retirement System (CalPERS), entered into a joint venture with BKM Capital Partner as part of the emerging manager platform. In 2018, BKM Capital Partners was recognized as one of the “Best Places to Work in Orange County,” by the Orange County Business Journal. In 2019, BKM Capital Partners raised $382m for its second US industrial investment fund.  Throughout Taghavi’s tenure as Chairman, BKM Capital Partners grew to nearly $2 billion in assets under management for large institutional investors. In 2020, Inc. magazine announced that BKM Capital Partners is No. 1,040 on its annual Inc. 5000 list due to its three-year revenue growth of 446%. The Inc. 5000 List refers to the 5,000 fastest-growing, privately held companies in America, which celebrates entrepreneurial success, leadership, and innovation In late 2020, Taghavi and Mack sold their collective majority ownership in BKM.

In 2018, Taghavi co-founded VoltEdge, a consumer brand company specializing in the design, development, and manufacturing of high-performance video game accessories sold through national brick and mortar and e-commerce retailers. In May 2020, VoltEdge was acquired by GameXpress, headquartered in Mexico City with operations in the United States. GameXpress is a leader in the distribution/retail/publishing of video games, accessories, and hardware in the Latin American markets.

References 

.
American businesspeople
1970 births
Living people